Nicaragua is a presidential republic, in which the President of Nicaragua is both head of state and head of government, and there is a multi-party system. Executive power is exercised by the government.

Legislative power is vested in both the government and the National Assembly. The judiciary is independent of the executive and the legislature.

Constitution

In 1995, the executive and legislative branches negotiated a reform of the 1987 Sandinista constitution which gave extensive new powers and independence to the National Assembly, including permitting the Assembly to override a presidential veto with a simple majority vote and eliminating the president's ability to pocket veto a bill. Members of the unicameral National Assembly are elected to concurrent five-year terms.

In January 2014, the National Assembly approved changes to the constitution, removing presidential term limits. This allowed current President Daniel Ortega to run for a third successive term.

Executive branch

|President
|Daniel Ortega
|FSLN
|11 January 2016
|-
|Vice President
|Rosario Murillo 
|FSLN
|11 January 2016
|}
The president and the vice president are elected for a single five-year term. With the reform of the constitution in 2014 the ban on re-election of the president has been removed.
The president appoints the Council of Ministers.

Legislative branch

The National Assembly (Asamblea Nacional) consists of 90 deputies elected from party lists drawn at the department and national level, plus the outgoing president and the runner-up in the presidential race, for a total of 92. In the 2011 elections, the Sandinista National Liberation Front won 63 seats (securing a majority), the Independent Liberal Party won 27 seats, and the Constitutionalist Liberal Party won 2 seats. This includes seats given to outgoing Vice President Jaime Morales Carazo and presidential runner-up Fabio Gadea Mantilla.

Outgoing Vice President Jaime Morales Carazot's seat would usually be given to the outgoing president.  However, Danial Ortega was re-elected after the Constitution was modified to remove term limits.

Political parties and elections

Judicial branch
The Supreme Court of Justice supervises the functioning of the still largely ineffective and overburdened judicial system. As part of the 1995 constitutional reforms, the independence of the Supreme Court was strengthened by increasing the number of magistrates from 9 to 12. In 2000, the number of Supreme Court Justices was increased to 16. Supreme Court justices are nominated by the political parties and elected to 5-year terms by the National Assembly.

Electoral branch
Led by a council of seven magistrates, the Supreme Electoral Council (CSE) is the co-equal branch of government responsible for organizing and conducting elections, plebiscites, and referendums. The magistrates and their alternates are elected to 5-year terms by the National Assembly. Constitutional changes in 2000 expanded the number of CSE magistrates from five to seven and gave the PLC and the FSLN a freer hand to name party activists to the council, prompting allegations that both parties were politicizing electoral institutions and processes and excluding smaller political parties.

Human rights

Freedom of speech is a right guaranteed by the Nicaraguan constitution, but media has come under censorship from time to time. Other constitutional freedoms include peaceful assembly and association, freedom of religion, and freedom of movement within the country, as well as foreign travel, emigration, and repatriation. The government also permits domestic and international human rights monitors to operate freely in Nicaragua.

The constitution prohibits discrimination based on birth, nationality, political belief, race, gender, language, religion, opinion, national origin, economic or social condition. Homosexuality has been legal since 2008.

All public and private sector workers, except the military and the police, are entitled to form and join unions of their own choosing, and they exercise this right extensively. Nearly half of Nicaragua's work force, including agricultural workers, is unionized. Workers have the right to strike. Collective bargaining is becoming more common in the private sector.

Administrative divisions

Nicaragua is divided into 15 departments: Boaco, Carazo, Chinandega, Chontales, Estelí, Granada, Jinotega, León, Madriz, Managua, Masaya, Matagalpa, Nueva Segovia, Rivas, Río San Juan, as well as in two autonomous regions: North Caribbean Coast Autonomous Region and South Caribbean Coast Autonomous Region.

Foreign relations

Nicaragua President Daniel Ortega said March 6, 2008 that the nation is breaking relations with Colombia "in solidarity with the Ecuadoran people", following the 2008 Andean diplomatic crisis. The relations were restored soon after.

Political pressure groups
Some political pressure groups are:
 National Workers Front or FNT is a Sandinista umbrella group of eight labor unions, including
 Farm Workers Association or ATC
 Health Workers Federation or FETSALUD
 Heroes and Martyrs Confederation of Professional Associations or CONAPRO
 National Association of Educators of Nicaragua or ANDEN
 National Union of Employees or UNE
 National Union of Farmers and Ranchers or UNAG
 Sandinista Workers' Centre or CST
 Union of Journalists of Nicaragua or UPN
 Permanent Congress of Workers or CPT is an umbrella group of four non-Sandinista labor unions, including
 Autonomous Nicaraguan Workers Central or CTN-A
 Confederation of Labour Unification or CUS
 Independent General Confederation of Labor or CGT-I
 Labor Action and Unity Central or CAUS
 Nicaraguan Workers' Central or CTN is an independent labor union
 Superior Council of Private Enterprise or COSEP is a confederation of business groups

See also

 2013-2019 Nicaraguan protests
 President of the Council of State of Nicaragua

References

External links
National Assembly of Nicaragua
Presidency of Nicarágua
Supreme Court of Nicarágua

 
Government of Nicaragua
South Caribbean Coast Autonomous Region
North Caribbean Coast Autonomous Region